Richard Cunningham Patterson Jr. (1886–1966) was an American government official and diplomat.

Patterson was the U.S. ambassador to Yugoslavia (1944–1946), Guatemala (1948–1951), and U.S. Minister to Switzerland (1951–53). While ambassador to Guatemala, he popularized the term duck test.

Early life and education 
Patterson was born in Omaha, Nebraska, the son of Richard Cunningham Patterson, an attorney, and Martha Belle Neiswanger. After working as a laborer in the gold mines of South Dakota and a year at the University of Nebraska, he received an engineer of mines degree at Columbia University’s School of Mines in 1912.

Patterson Affair

Amid charges in Guatemala that Patterson was intervening in Guatemala's internal affairs, and rumors that Patterson's life was in danger, Patterson hurriedly departed for the United States on March 28, 1950. His mission in Guatemala was terminated on April 24, 1951, when a new ambassador, Rudolf E. Schoenfeld, presented his credentials.

References

External links
 http://www.correctionhistory.org/html/chronicl/nycdoc/html/rcpbio3.html
 The Richard Cunningham Papers at the Truman Library

1886 births
1966 deaths
Ambassadors of the United States to Guatemala
Ambassadors of the United States to Switzerland
Ambassadors of the United States to Yugoslavia
20th-century American diplomats
Columbia School of Engineering and Applied Science alumni
University of Nebraska Omaha alumni